Claudio Marcelo Enría (born 28 August 1973 in San Justo, Santa Fe) is a former Argentine football striker who most recently played for Colón de Santa Fe.

Enría started his career in 1992 with Newell's Old Boys, after only one season with the club he left to play for Club Atlético Lanús.

In 1998, Enría joined Sevilla FC in Spain, but it didn't work out for him and he returned to Argentina later that year to play for  Belgrano de Córdoba.

In 1999, Enría had his first spell with Colón but he left the club to join Gimnasia y Esgrima La Plata in 2000.

In 2003, Enría made a second attempt to play in Spain with CD Leganés but after only one season with the club he returned to Gimnasia y Esgrima La Plata.

In 2005, he joined Vélez Sársfield and in 2006 he rejoined Colón.

References

External links
 Argentine Primera statistics at Futbol XXI

Argentine footballers
Association football forwards
Argentine Primera División players
Newell's Old Boys footballers
Club Atlético Lanús footballers
Club Atlético Belgrano footballers
Club Atlético Colón footballers
Club de Gimnasia y Esgrima La Plata footballers
Club Atlético Vélez Sarsfield footballers
La Liga players
Sevilla FC players
CD Leganés players
Argentine expatriate footballers
People from San Justo Department, Santa Fe
1973 births
Living people
Sportspeople from Santa Fe Province